Álex Dario Aguinaga Garzón (born 9 July 1969) is an Ecuadorian former professional football player and manager. A midfielder during his playing career, he is one of the all-time cap leaders for Ecuador with 109 matches, scoring 23 goals. Aguinaga is known as one of the best Ecuadorian footballers of all time. On the club level, Aguinaga has played for Deportivo Quito, Necaxa, Cruz Azul and LDU Quito.

Club career

Necaxa

Aguinaga spent the majority of his club career at Necaxa, whom he joined in 1989, winning 3 championships with the club. In 1999 Aguinaga was crucial for Necaxa's first CONCACAF Champions Cup title. Necaxa would go on to participate in the first edition of the FIFA Club World Cup where in the group stage Aguinaga scored against Vasco da Gama, but missed a penalty against Manchester United. He scored in the penalty shootout against Real Madrid in the 3rd place match. 

He also holds a Mexican passport. His grandfather is of Spanish descent.

LDU Quito

After winning a league title in Ecuador, Aguinaga decided to retire from football.

International career
Aguinaga earned his first cap for Ecuador on March 5, 1987. In the same match, he scored his first goal for the team. Over the year, he would form an integral part of the national team. He would captain the team for a number of years and assisted in the goal by Iván Kaviedes that assured Ecuador's first qualification to the FIFA World Cup in 2002, in which he played. This was the only World Cup where Aguinaga participated.

International goals

Managerial career
Aguinaga's managerial career began in late 2010 as an assistant to Manuel Lapuente at Mexican club América. He left the club in early 2011 when Lapuente was sacked. In March of the same year, he was named to his first full-time managerial post as the new manager of Guayaquil-based club Barcelona following the sacking of Rubén Darío Insúa. In late May of the same year, he resigned from his position to not interfere and influence the club's presidential elections the following month. He has not ruled out a return after the election.

In September 2014, Aguinaga became the manager of Correcaminos UAT, which plays in the Ascenso MX second professional level league of the Mexican football league system.

Personal life
Aguinaga's daughter Cristiane is an actress and has appeared in several Mexican series and telenovelas such as Carita de Ángel and La rosa de Guadalupe.

Honors

Club
Necaxa
Primera División: 1994-95, 1995–96, 1998 Invierno
CONCACAF Cup Winners Cup: 1994
Mexican Cup: 1995
Campeón de Campeones: 1995
CONCACAF Champions' Cup: 1999
FIFA Club World Cup Third Place: 2000
LDU Quito
Serie A: 2005 Apertura

International

Canada Cup: 1999

Individual
Ideal team of South America: 1989
Number 7 retired by Club Necaxa as a recognition to his contribution to the club.

See also
 List of men's footballers with 100 or more international caps

References

External links
 
 International statistics at rsssf
 
 Video at YouTube

1969 births
Living people
People from Ibarra, Ecuador
Ecuadorian footballers
Ecuadorian expatriate footballers
Ecuadorian expatriate sportspeople in Mexico
Expatriate footballers in Mexico
Club Necaxa footballers
Cruz Azul footballers
S.D. Quito footballers
L.D.U. Quito footballers
Ecuadorian Serie A players
Liga MX players
Ecuador international footballers
FIFA Century Club
1987 Copa América players
1989 Copa América players
1991 Copa América players
1993 Copa América players
1995 Copa América players
1999 Copa América players
2001 Copa América players
2004 Copa América players
2002 CONCACAF Gold Cup players
2002 FIFA World Cup players
Barcelona S.C. managers
L.D.U. Loja managers
San Luis F.C. managers
C.D. Cuenca managers
L.D.U. Quito managers
Association football midfielders
Ecuadorian football managers